Mount Mackay is a locality in the Cassowary Coast Region, Queensland, Australia.

Geography 
The boundaries of the locality are the same as the boundaries of Mount Mackay National Park. The national park provides a safe habitat for the mahogany glider and the southern cassowary.

History 
The locality takes its name from the mountain. In 2005, the Mount Mackay National Park was created from the Mount Mackay State Forest.

References 

Cassowary Coast Region
Localities in Queensland